Varina is an incorporated small, rural village in Pocahontas County, Iowa, United States. The population was 68 at the time of the 2020 census.

History
Varina got its start in the year 1899, following construction of the Chicago, Milwaukee and St. Paul Railway through that territory. It was named after Varina Farms, a plantation established by John Rolfe in Jamestown, Virginia.

Geography
Varina is located at  (42.659864, -94.898808).

Demographics

2010 census
At the 2010 census there were 71 people in 30 households, including 17 families, in the city. The racial makup of the city was 97.2% White and 2.8% African American. Hispanic or Latino of any race were 7.0%.

Of the 30 households 30.0% had children under the age of 18 living with them, 43.3% were married couples living together, 6.7% had a female householder with no husband present, 6.7% had a male householder with no wife present, and 43.3% were non-families. 43.3% of households were one person and 20% were one person aged 65 or older. The average household size was 2.37 and the average family size was 3.35.

The median age was 35.5 years. 36.6% of residents were under the age of 18; 0.0% were between the ages of 18 and 24; 19.7% were from 25 to 44; 22.4% were from 45 to 64; and 21.1% were 65 or older. The gender makeup of the city was 53.5% male and 46.5% female.

2000 census
As of the census of 2000, there were 90 people in 36 households, including 25 families, in the city. The racial makup of the city was 100.00% White.

Of the 36 households 27.8% had children under the age of 18 living with them, 52.8% were married couples living together, 11.1% had a female householder with no husband present, and 27.8% were non-families. 22.2% of households were one person and 11.1% were one person aged 65 or older. The average household size was 2.50 and the average family size was 2.85.

The age distribution was 23.3% under the age of 18, 5.6% from 18 to 24, 27.8% from 25 to 44, 20.0% from 45 to 64, and 23.3% 65 or older. The median age was 40 years. For every 100 females, there were 114.3 males. For every 100 females age 18 and over, there were 122.6 males.

The median household income was $35,469 and the median family income  was $35,156. Males had a median income of $24,688 versus $18,750 for females. The per capita income for the city was $13,611. There were 9.7% of families and 12.0% of the population living below the poverty line, including 47.4% of under eighteens and none of those over 64.

Education
Varina is served by the Newell-Fonda Community School District, which operates Newell-Fonda High School in Newell. It was created on July 1, 1993, as a consolidation of the Fonda Community School District and the Newell-Providence Community School District.

Churches
There is a Catholic and Methodist Church in Varina. The Catholic church is Saint Columbkilles and the Methodist is First United Methodist Church.

Organizations

American Legion Post 588 W.D. Steiner is located in Varina.

References

Cities in Pocahontas County, Iowa
Cities in Iowa